Padduram is an upcoming directorial debut film by Ajay Monga who has written films like Fashion and Corporate. The film is set to be released in 2023.

Plot
Padduram is the story of a boy Debashish Mehra (Debu) who has a flatulence problem. Being the target of ridicule the boy starts going into his shell. Worried parents try to remedy the situation but do not succeed. It is only when he befriends Aditya that Debu starts coming to terms with himself. Eventually, Debu turns his weakness into strength and helps his dad in his business.

Cast
Rachit Sidana as Debashish Mehra(a.k.a. Debu/Dabboo), an 11-year-old boy who has a flatulence problem.
Juhi Parmar as Gitanjali Mehra, Debu's mother
Suresh Menon as Debu's father
Shubham Kataria as Aditya, Debu's friend
Vijay Patkar as Gagan the mysterious neighbor
Deven Bhojani as the narrator
Anshika as Aditi, Aditya's sister

Production
The shooting of the film was held in Indore and Mumbai. Initially, Darsheel Safary was cast to play one of the main characters in the film. But due to his demand for a steep price, the role was given to debutant Shubham Kataria. Rachit Sidana who played Little Iqbal in Thoda Pyaar Thoda Magic plays the title role of Padduram. Juhi Parmar, Suresh Menon, Deven Bhojani and Vijay Patkar form the supporting cast of the film.

Promotion
Ajay Monga has also initiated one of its kind merchandising activities for the film's promotion through his venture firm Padduram franchise pvt. ltd.(PFPL) The firm will be engaged into Promotional giveaways like Padduram branded toys, T-shirts, comic books etc.

Music
The tracks are composed by Gaurav Dasgupta and Ashutosh Singh.

Track listing

References

External links
 
 

2011 films
2010s Hindi-language films